Snoopy was a Dutch female disco duo. The group was founded by music manager Han Meijer in 1978 with singers Ethel Mezas (born 1956) and Florence Woerdings (born 1956). Woerdings left the project in 1979 and was replaced with Maureen Seedorf. The group ceased activities in 1980.

In 1978–1979 they had a hit with "No Time for a Tango". It reached number 7 in Germany, number 9 in Austria, and number 10 in Switzerland.

Members 
 Ethel Mezas (born 1956) — vocals
 Florence Woerdings (born 1956) —  vocals (until 1979)
 Maureen Seedorf — vocals (1979-1980)

Discography

Albums 
 1980: Snoopy

Singles

References

External links 
 

Dutch pop music groups
Dutch musical duos
Dutch girl groups
Dutch disco groups
Pop music duos
Disco duos
Female musical duos